Krylen Hill is a hill  southwest of Valken Hill, in the northern part of the Ahlmann Ridge in Queen Maud Land, Antarctica. It was mapped by Norwegian cartographers from surveys and air photos by the Norwegian–British–Swedish Antarctic Expedition (1949–52) and air photos by the Norwegian expedition (1958–59) and named Krylen (the hump).

References

Hills of Queen Maud Land
Princess Martha Coast